Altınyayla (formerly: Dirmil) is a town in Burdur Province in the Mediterranean region of Turkey. It is the seat of Altınyayla District. Its population is 3,017 (2021).

References

Populated places in Burdur Province
Altınyayla District, Burdur
Towns in Turkey